Lake Crabtree County Park is a park in Wake County, North Carolina.  It is a forested area between Cary, Morrisville, and Raleigh-Durham International Airport, bounded by the northeastern shore of Lake Crabtree, I-40, and Aviation Parkway.  The main entrance is on the Aviation Parkway side and is equipped with two playgrounds (for different age groups), a boat dock (as well as rentable sailboats), bathrooms, an observation tower, and other amenities.  A system of hiking and biking trails crosses through the park, with the most used one (especially by hikers) along the lakeshore.  This trail connects the park entrance to the Black Creek Greenway-Old Reedy Creek Road intersection, near the entrance to William B. Umstead State Park. 

Since 2012, Lake Crabtree County Park has been a host venue for the Valor Games Southeast, a three-day adapted-sports competition for veterans and members of the Armed Forces with disabilities. The park features a wheelchair accessible dock providing unparalleled access to the water for people with disabilities. Since 2016, Lake Crabtree is home to the NC State University Sailing Team, and the host venue for the SailPack Women's Intercollegiate Regatta, as well as the Triangle Tango Regatta, a co-ed fleet racing event, both held in the fall. Community Sailing is a featured activity during the summer at the Lake. The RTP High School sailing program is also located at Lake Crabtree and hosts interscholastic regattas on site.

References

External links
Park website
Wake County Parks, Recreation, and Open Space
Bridge II Sports - Valor Games Southeast
NC State University Sailing Team
RTP High School Sailing

County parks in the United States
Protected areas of Wake County, North Carolina
Parks in North Carolina